The Lane Hotel is a historic former hotel building in Rogers, Arkansas, United States. It is a five-story yellow brick Spanish Revival building, designed by architect John Parks Almand and completed in 1929.  It is the largest Spanish Revival building in Arkansas, with a prominent colonnade of arches at the second level, above a first floor series of commercial storefronts, and a central tower.  The hotel was not successful, having been completed just at the outset of the Great Depression, and went through a succession of owners before closing in 1965.  Beginning in 1999 it was a retirement community known as Peachtree on the Lane

It was refurbished in 2017 and now houses Haas Hall Academy Rogers campus.

The building was listed on the National Register of Historic Places in 1988.

See also
National Register of Historic Places listings in Benton County, Arkansas

References

Hotel buildings on the National Register of Historic Places in Arkansas
Hotel buildings completed in 1929
Buildings and structures in Rogers, Arkansas
National Register of Historic Places in Benton County, Arkansas
Individually listed contributing properties to historic districts on the National Register in Arkansas